Malaysian Gujaratis are people of full or partial Gujarati descent who were born in or immigrated to Malaysia. The community arrived to Malaya during 14 century to trade spices with Sultanate of Malacca. But, only during the 19th century this community settled in Malaysia. Most of this community work as traders. The Gujaratis were mainly from the ports of Cambay, Kutch and Surat in India  and settled in urban part of Malaya like Georgetown, Kuala Lumpur and Ipoh.

See also
 Malaysian Indians

References
 

Ethnic groups in Malaysia
Immigration to Malaysia
Gujarati people
Gujarati diaspora
Indo-Aryan peoples